The men's 4 × 10 kilometre relay at the 1956 Winter Olympics took place on 4 February. Fourteen teams and fifty-six skiers participated in the event. The Soviet team won the event. Finland came in second and Sweden took the bronze.

Medalists

Source:

Results

* Deficit is minutes and seconds

Source:

See also

 1956 Winter Olympics

Notes

References
 

Men's 4 x 10 kilometre relay
Men's 4 × 10 kilometre relay cross-country skiing at the Winter Olympics